The Delaware United States House election for 1802 was held from October 9–20, 1802. The incumbent Representative James A. Bayard Sr. was defeated by the former state representative Caesar Augustus Rodney with 50.11% of the vote and 15 votes.

Results

Results by county

References

Delaware
1802
1802 Delaware elections